Godech Nunatak (Godechki Nunatak \go-'dech-ki 'nu-na-tak\) is a rocky 410m peak in lower Huron Glacier, in the north foothills of Tangra Mountains on Livingston Island, South Shetland Islands in Antarctica.  The peak is named after the town of Godech in Western Bulgaria.

Location

Maps
 L.L. Ivanov et al. Antarctica: Livingston Island and Greenwich Island, South Shetland Islands. Scale 1:100000 topographic map. Sofia: Antarctic Place-names Commission of Bulgaria, 2005.
 L.L. Ivanov. Antarctica: Livingston Island and Greenwich, Robert, Snow and Smith Islands. Scale 1:120000 topographic map.  Troyan: Manfred Wörner Foundation, 2009.

References
 Godech Nunatak. SCAR Composite Gazetteer of Antarctica
 Bulgarian Antarctic Gazetteer. Antarctic Place-names Commission. (details in Bulgarian, basic data in English)

External links
 Godech Nunatak. Copernix satellite image

Nunataks of Livingston Island